Transition metal benzyne complexes are organometallic complexes that contain benzyne ligands (C6H4).  Unlike benzyne itself, these complexes are less reactive although they undergo a number of insertion reactions.

Examples
The studies of metal-benzyne complexes were initiated with the preparation of zirconocene complex by reaction diphenylzirconocene with trimethylphosphine. 

Cp2ZrPh2 + PMe3 → Cp2Zr(C6H4)(PMe3) + PhH

The preparation of Ta(η5-C5Me5)(C6H4)Me2 proceeds similarly, requiring the phenyl complex Ta(η5-C5Me5)(C6H5)Me3. This complex is prepared by treatment of Ta(η5-C5Me5)Me3Cl with phenyllithium. Upon heating, this complex eliminates methane, leaving the benzyne complex:

Ta(η5-C5Me5)(C6H5)Me3 → Ta(η5-C5Me5)(C6H4)Me2 + CH4

The second example of a benzyne complex is Ni(η2-C6H4)(dcpe) (dcpe = Cy2PCH2CH2PCy2). It is produced by dehalogenation of the bromophenyl complex NiCl(C6H4Br-2)(dcpe) with sodium amalgam. Its coordination geometry is close to trigonal planar.

Reactivity
Benzyne complexes react with a variety of electrophiles, resulting in insertion into one M-C bond. With trifluoroacetic acid, benzene is lost to give the trifluoroacetate Ni(O2CF3)2(dcpe).

Structural trends
Several benzyne complexes have been examined by X-ray crystallography.
 align="center"

References

Organometallic chemistry
Coordination chemistry
Transition metals